Harpalus brevicornis is a species of ground beetle in the subfamily Harpalinae. It was described by Ernst Friedrich Germar in 1824.

References

brevicornis
Beetles described in 1824